This is a list of cities and towns in South America that have, or once had, town tramway (urban tramway, or streetcar) systems as part of their public transport system. Separate lists have been created for Argentina, Brazil and Chile to increase user-friendliness and reduce article size.

Argentina

Bolivia

Note for Potosí: System built and (according to one source) inaugurated. Not known whether public service was operated.

Brazil

Chile

Colombia

Ecuador

Guyana

Paraguay

Peru

Suriname

Trinidad and Tobago

Uruguay

Venezuela

See also

 List of town tramway systems in Africa
 List of town tramway systems in Asia
 List of town tramway systems in Central America
 List of town tramway systems in Europe
 List of town tramway systems in North America
 List of town tramway systems
 List of tram and light rail transit systems
 List of metro systems
 List of trolleybus systems

References 

Town
 
Tram transport-related lists
Tram